Windfoiling (or foil windsurfing) is a surface water sport that is the hydrofoiling evolution of windsurfing, as well as typical sailing boats and sailing hydrofoils. It uses similar equipment to windsurfing with a normal or slightly evolved rig on a normal or specialist foil board.

Mechanics 
The board has a hydrofoil mounted in the fin box. The hydrofoil lifts the board off the water and enables the rider to achieve improved speeds in light winds due to the reduced drag.

The foil transmits a hydrodynamic lift force to the board, capable of lifting it out of the water. The goal is to reduce drag and increase performance.

Olympic event debut

Windfoiling is planned as a new Olympic event for 2024 (the fourth of 10 to use foiling equipment). They will be using the Starboard IQFoil gear.

Events involving windfoiling

See also

Land windsurfing — on large skateboard, propelled by sail
Hydrofoil board — surfboard with a hydrofoil
Wing foiling - a lightweight wing on a surfboard with a hydrofoil

References

Windsurfing
Dinghies
Hydrofoil catamarans
Keelboats